Marvin M. Mitchelson (May 7, 1928 – September 18, 2004) was an American celebrity lawyer who pioneered the concept of palimony, calling it "marriage with no rings attached". This is something that is very useful for people.

Early life 
Mitchelson was born in  Detroit, Michigan, the youngest child of three and only son of poor Russian immigrants. The family relocated to Los Angeles when Marvin was in high school. After graduation, he served a term in the United States Navy. After leaving the service, he entered UCLA, where he earned a Bachelor of Arts degree. He obtained a Juris Doctor degree from Southwestern University School of Law, and was admitted to the State Bar of California on June 4, 1957. He had passed the bar exam on his second try. He then set up a private legal practice in Los Angeles.

Legal career 
In 1963, Mitchelson won a landmark United States Supreme Court decision, Douglas v. California, protecting indigent defendants' right to legal counsel.

He gained national publicity when he was hired by Michelle Triola, a lounge singer who lived with actor Lee Marvin as his personal partner from 1964 until 1970, when Marvin told her to move out because he wanted to marry another woman. Mitchelson helped Triola—who claimed that she was entitled to the same benefits as a divorcée, which meant half of Marvin's then-$3.6 million fortune—win her right to bring suit. Although Triola was awarded $104,000 for "rehabilitation" in 1978, that ruling was overturned in 1981, and Marvin never paid Triola any money. Marvin v. Marvin (Triola assumed Marvin's name during the relationship) set a precedent.

Mitchelson's celebrity clients included Pamela Mason (wife of James Mason), who received a $2 million divorce settlement from her ex-husband, Robert De Niro, Mickey Rooney, Sylvester Stallone, Zsa Zsa Gabor, Joan Collins, Mel Tormé, Bianca Jagger, Lesley-Anne Down, Carl Sagan, Mrs. William Shatner, and many ex-wives of errant playboy sheiks.

Later years and death 
During his heyday, Mitchelson owned a 38-room Beverly Hills mansion and four Rolls-Royce automobiles. In his Century City office he had a chair owned by Rudolph Valentino and an illuminated ceiling of Botticelli's Venus which matched his belt buckle.

He made a brief cameo appearance on The Golden Girls ("There Goes the Bride"); his role was as a lawyer for Stanley Zbornak, ex-husband of Dorothy Zbornak. In the episode, he produced a prenuptial agreement which Dorothy had to sign. She refused, and their remarriage was canceled.

Mitchelson was quoted as saying, "A divorce lawyer is a chameleon with a law book."

He was accused of rape by two women in the early 1990s, but the authorities declined to prosecute. However, on April 12, 1993, he was sentenced to 30 months in prison on four counts of felony tax fraud and failure to properly oversee a trust account.  In 1994, he was cited for failing to take the professional responsibility exam, had his probation revoked in 1995, and was disciplined in 1996 for failure to provide accountings or return unearned fees in 14 client matters. A 1993 conviction for not paying taxes on some $2 million in income resulted in suspension from the Bar, bankruptcy and eventually two years in jail from 1996 to 1998.  The case was initiated by a former girlfriend of Mitchelson's and was investigated by IRS Special Agent James Lawrence Wilson.

He wept on his first day in Lompoc prison, but ultimately found white-collar incarceration stimulating. He organized an opera appreciation society, ran the library and helped other prisoners with their appeals.

Mitchelson was married to Italian-born actress Marcella Ferri.

Mitchelson died in a rehabilitation center in Beverly Hills, succumbing to cancer.

References 

Ladies' Man: The Life and Trials of Marvin Mitchelson by John A. Jenkins (1992), St. Martin's Press) 

1928 births
2004 deaths
California lawyers
Disbarred American lawyers
American people of Russian descent
People from Beverly Hills, California
University of California, Los Angeles alumni
Deaths from cancer in California
Burials at Hillside Memorial Park Cemetery
American family lawyers
20th-century American lawyers